The 2007–08 season was the 64th season in the existence of Lille OSC and the club's eighth consecutive season in the top flight of French football. In addition to the domestic league, Lille participated in this season's editions of the Coupe de France, and the Coupe de la Ligue.

Players

First-team squad

Players out on loan

Transfers

In

Out

Pre-season and friendlies

Competitions

Overall record

Ligue 1

League table

Results summary

Results by round

Matches

Coupe de France

Coupe de la Ligue

Statistics

Goalscorers

References

Lille OSC seasons
Lille